Yumlembam Premi Devi  (born 6 December 1993) is an Indian women's international footballer who plays as a midfielder. She has played internationals for the India women's national football team, and at a club level she has played for Manipur and Eastern Sporting Union.

International career
She made her debut in the friendly series against Bahrain in 2011. She was part of the team at the 2014 Asian Games and at the 2015–16 AFC Women's Olympic Qualifying Tournament.

Honours

India
SAFF Women's Championship: 2012, 2014, 2016
 South Asian Games Gold medal: 2016

Eastern Sporting Union
 Indian Women's League: 2016–17

Railways
 Senior Women's National Football Championship: 2015–16

References

1993 births
Living people
Indian women's footballers
India women's international footballers
India women's youth international footballers
Footballers from Manipur
Sportswomen from Manipur
Women's association football midfielders
Footballers at the 2014 Asian Games
Asian Games competitors for India
South Asian Games gold medalists for India
South Asian Games medalists in football
Eastern Sporting Union players
Indian Women's League players
21st-century Indian women
21st-century Indian people